Hans Ernst Karl, Graf von Zieten (5 March 1770  – 3 May 1848) was an officer in the Prussian Army during the Napoleonic Wars.

Biography
Zieten was born in Dechtow in the Margraviate of Brandenburg; he was not related to the Frederician general Hans Joachim von Zieten.

During the Waterloo Campaign of 1815, Lieutenant-General von Zieten commanded the Prussian I Corps. The corps fought a holding action against the French on 15 June, and was heavily engaged against the French the next day at the Battle of Ligny, and then again two days later on June 18 at the Battle of Waterloo.

On 1 July, Zieten's I Corps participated in the Battle of Issy just outside the walls of Paris. At the end of the campaign on 7 July, his corps was granted the honour of being the first major Coalition force to enter Paris.

King Frederick William III of Prussia granted Zieten the title of Graf, or count, on 3 September 1817. At the age of 69, he was promoted to Generalfeldmarschall on 9 September 1839. Zieten died in Warmbrunn.

References and notes

1770 births
1848 deaths
Field marshals of Prussia
Prussian commanders of the Napoleonic Wars
People from the Margraviate of Brandenburg
Recipients of the Pour le Mérite (military class)
Recipients of the Order of St. George of the Second Degree
Honorary Knights Grand Cross of the Order of the Bath
People from Havelland
Military personnel from Brandenburg